Songlingornis is a prehistoric bird genus from the Early Cretaceous. Its fossils have been found in the Jiufotang Formation of Liaoning (PRC). The age of these rocks is somewhat disputed, but probably around the early Aptian, 125-120 million years ago. Only one species, Songlingornis linghensis, is known at present.

It was a close relative of Yanornis and together with this and Yixianornis forms a clade of early modern birds. It is sometimes considered to be the same genus as Yanornis (which, described after Songlingornis, would then be merged into that taxon), but this is not universally accepted.

Footnotes

References

  (2006): Insight into the evolution of avian flight from a new clade of Early Cretaceous ornithurines from China and the morphology of Yixianornis grabaui. Journal of Anatomy 208 (3):287-308.   PDF fulltext Electronic Appendix
  (2004) Enantiornithine Bird with Diapsidian Skull and Its Dental Development in the Early Cretaceous in Liaoning, China. Acta Geologica Sinica 78(1): 1–7.
 (1997) Mesozoic Birds of China, Phoenix Valley Provincial Aviary, Taiwan: 153 pp.
  (2004): The Theropod Database: Phylogeny of taxa. Retrieved 2013-MAR-02.

Early Cretaceous birds of Asia
Bird genera
Songlingornithids
Fossil taxa described in 1997
Jiufotang fauna